Playing with Fire is the only studio album by American media personality and rapper Kevin Federline, released on October 31, 2006, through Federline Records. The album's executive producer was Federline's then-wife Britney Spears, who contributes vocals to the song "Crazy", which is on the album. She and Federline composed two tracks that did not get included in the album. Contributions to the album's production came from a variety of producers and songwriters, including DJ Bosko Stix Baby, J.R. Rotem, and Versatile. Reception to Playing with Fire by music critics was overwhelmingly negative, and it is currently the lowest-rated album on music review aggregator Metacritic. Criticism was levied towards its vapid lyrics, uninspired production, and Federline's performance.

The first single option, "PopoZão", was produced by Disco D and co-composed by Spears; the song takes inspiration from Brazil's favela funk. The song was panned by critics and the single was canceled. "Lose Control" was provided a download-only release in October 2006 and premiered with a performance at the 2006 Teen Choice Awards. Playing with Fire debuted at number 151 on the Billboard 200, with sales of 6,000 copies, and has sold over 16,000 copies in the United States according to Nielsen Soundscan.

Development 

In July 2004, pop singer Britney Spears became engaged to Federline, whom she had met three months before. The romance received intense attention from the media, since Federline had recently broken up with actress Shar Jackson, who was still pregnant with their second child at the time. Federline felt the public and press saw him as someone who was "in Spears' shadow" and only wanted to benefit from the relationship. Trying to be seen as a recording artist himself, Federline decided to work on a studio album, inspired by hip hop music. Spears financed the project, because the singer wanted her husband to feel supported by her. Federline then worked with several producers including Christopher Notes Olsen and J.R. Rotem. Spears also composed two tracks with Federline titled "Y'all Ain't Ready" and "PopoZão"; however, they were not in the final track listing. When asked about the album, Federline said, "It's like an upbeat club record. Everything on it, you can just pretty much dance to it. It says a lot, in a fun way. It speaks for itself."

Release and promotion 
The first single option was "PopoZão". According to Chuck Arnold of People, "the frenetic dance track (its title refers to a bootylicious posterior) taps into the favela funk sound popular in Rio de Janeiro and features production by Disco D, who keeps things popping with breakneck beats." Arnold considered the song annoying, and disliked Federline's rap. The song was panned by critics, so it wasn't included in the album.

The album's download-only release, "Lose Control", was premiered with a performance at the 2006 Teen Choice Awards. On September 27, 2006, it was announced that "Crazy", featuring Spears, would be included on the album instead of "PopoZão", and that "Lose Control" had been chosen as the lead single instead. Along with the announcement, it was revealed that the first 500 fans who pre-ordered Playing With Fire via Federline's online store would receive an autographed photo. All pre-orderers were also entered into a contest to attend a record release party in Los Angeles hosted by Spears. Playing with Fire was released on October 31, 2006, through Federline Records. One week after the release, Spears filed for divorce from Federline, listing irreconcilable differences.

Tour 
In early October 2006, Federline commenced the Playing with Fire Tour at Webster Hall in New York City, where he performed to an estimated audience of 300 out of a total seating capacity of 1,500, with only one-third of attendees remaining by the end of the concert. On October 8, 2006, many of the tickets for the show at House of Blues in Chicago were given away for free. Following the poor reception, the remaining dates were ultimately cancelled.

Reception

Critical response 

Playing with Fire was universally panned by critics. The album holds a score of 15 out of 100 (indicating "overwhelming dislike") based on 7 critical reviews, according to the music review aggregator Metacritic. It is the lowest-rated album on the site, with its score being half of that of the second-lowest rated album, The Bloodhound Gang's Hefty Fine. A Billboard reviewer was critical about the production and Federline's rap, stating that, "in general, Federline enunciates well." A critic from Now commented that "his flow is generic and instantly forgettable and his lyrics are trite, inconsequential and full of self-importance", while Chris Willman of Entertainment Weekly gave the album an F, stating that the concept of it is "about squandering Britney Spears' fortune." AllMusic's Stephen Thomas Erlewine gave it 1/5 stars and panned it as bad in an uninteresting way, further adding that it is "too serious about being taken seriously to get unintentionally silly, and the album is a bore because of it. It's also a bore because he's a bore, writing endlessly about the same three topics: his alleged superstardom, his hatred of the media, his love of parties and dope." Jimmy Newlin of Slant Magazine said that none of the album's producers have credibility or are innovative, which resulted in "half-hearted beats, annoying musical tics, and enough bass to make your speakers beg for mercy." Newlin further added, "Federline can only rap about weed, his bank account, his wife, fighting anyone who looks at him sideways, and partying 'til three days from now —- roughly in that order... An oh-so-tiny sliver of myself kind of wanted Playing With Fire to be less aggressively shitty than it is, if only so the restless, rapacious media would ease off this tattered target of its ire—unfortunately, this disc is just as disposable and dumb as you'd expect." In a positive review, Ron Harris of Associated Press stated that Playing with Fire "is a credible, entertaining debut", praising tracks such as "Privilege", "Kept on Talkin'" and "Crazy".

Chart performance 
Playing with Fire sold 6,000 copies in its first week, debuting at number 151 on the Billboard 200. As of January 22, 2007, the album has sold over 16,000 units in the United States, according to Nielsen SoundScan.

Track listing

Charts

References

Bibliography 

2006 debut albums
Albums produced by Disco D
Albums produced by J. R. Rotem
Kevin Federline albums
Self-released albums
Albums produced by Andrew Roettger